Bissenty Mendy (born 3 June 1993) is a Senegalese professional footballer who plays as a centre-back for Annecy.

Career
Moving to France from Senegal at the age of 10, he is a youth product of Boulogne-Billancourt since the age of 15. He began his senior career with Viry-Châtillon in 2012. He returned to Boulogne-Billancourt in 2015, and after 3 seasons there had stints with Versailles and Sedan. He transferred to Annecy on 30 May 2020. He helped them come in 2nd place for the 2021–22 Championnat National and earned promotion into the Ligue 2. He made his professional debut with Annecy in a 2–1 Ligue 2 loss to Niort on 30 July 2022.

References

External links
 
 

1993 births
Living people
Footballers from Dakar
Senegalese footballers
ES Viry-Châtillon players
AC Boulogne-Billancourt players
FC Versailles 78 players
CS Sedan Ardennes players
FC Annecy players
Ligue 2 players
Championnat National players
Championnat National 2 players
Championnat National 3 players
Association football defenders
Senegalese expatriate footballers
Senegalese expatriates in France
Expatriate footballers in France